Juha Petteri Lind (born 2 January 1974 in Helsinki, Finland) is a Finnish former professional ice hockey player.

Lind started his career with Jokerit his hometown team.  He was drafted 178th overall by the Minnesota North Stars in the 1992 NHL Entry Draft.  He remained with Jokerit until 1997 when he joined the Dallas Stars. He would spend two years in Dallas before being sent to the Montreal Canadiens in a trade for Scott Thornton. Lind moved to Södertälje SK in Sweden's Elitserien in 2001 and after three seasons, he returned to Jokerit in 2004.  In 2005, Lind moved to Red Bull Salzburg EC in Austria and after two seasons, he returned to Sweden, signing with Leksands IF.  For 2008–09, Lind returned to Jokerit for his third spell with the team.

Lind's father Arvi Lind is a retired television news presenter.

Career statistics

Regular season and playoffs

International

External links

1974 births
Living people
Dallas Stars players
EC Red Bull Salzburg players
Finnish ice hockey left wingers
Ice hockey players at the 1998 Winter Olympics
Ice hockey players at the 2002 Winter Olympics
Jokerit players
Kalamazoo Wings (1974–2000) players
Leksands IF players
Medalists at the 1998 Winter Olympics
Minnesota North Stars draft picks
Montreal Canadiens players
Olympic bronze medalists for Finland
Olympic ice hockey players of Finland
Olympic medalists in ice hockey
Quebec Citadelles players
Södertälje SK players
Ice hockey people from Helsinki